Rippin is a surname. Notable people with the surname include:

 Andrew Rippin (1950–2016), Canadian Islamic studies scholar
 Jane Deeter Rippin (1882–1953, née Deeter), American social worker
 Niamh Rippin (born 1994), British gymnast

See also
 Rippon (surname)
 Rypin, redirected from Rippin